Teri McKeever (born c. 1962) is an American college and Olympic swimming coach.   She was the head coach of the California Golden Bears women's swimming team at the University of California, Berkeley, from 1993 until her firing in 2023.  Her Cal Bears teams have won four NCAA national championships.  McKeever served as an assistant coach for the United States Olympic women's swim team three times (2004, 2008, and 2020), and as the head coach of the 2012 U.S. Olympic women's swim team.

Early years 

McKeever was born in 1962.  She was the oldest child in a family of ten children.  Her father, Mike McKeever, and her father's twin brother, Marlin McKeever, both attended the University of Southern California, and were both first-team All-American linemen for the USC Trojans football team in 1959.  Her father died in 1967 from head injuries received in a 1965 car accident, after twenty-two months in a coma.  Her mother later remarried, and had seven more children with her second husband.  The family athletic influence remained strong, with all of her nine siblings participating in a variety of sports.  Her sisters Kristi and Kelli were members of the U.S. national field hockey team.

College career 

McKeever attended the University of Southern California (USC), where she swam for the USC Trojans women's swimming and diving team from 1980 to 1983 and joined international women's fraternity Alpha Gamma Delta in 1981. She competed in four NCAA national championship and contributed to the Trojans' four straight national top-ten finishes.  She received All-America honors in 1980 and 1981, and following her 1983 senior season, she was recognized as the university's outstanding student-athlete.  She graduated from USC with a bachelor's degree in education in 1983, and later earned a master's degree in athletic administration in 1987.

Coaching career 

McKeever began coaching as an assistant coach at USC from 1984 to 1987. She has been the head coach of the California Golden Bears women's swimming team at the University of California, Berkeley since 1992–93.  Since 1996–97 (her fifth season as head coach), her California Bears swim teams have consistently finished among the top ten Division I college teams in the nation.  The Bears women have won five Pac-12 Conference team championships, and four NCAA national championships (2009, 2011, 2012, 2015).  She has been named Pacific-10 Conference Coach of the Year nine times and College Swimming Coaches Association of America (CSCAA) Coach of the Year five times

After USC and before going to the Cal Bears, McKeever was the head coach of the Women's swimming team at Fresno State University in Fresno, California.

McKeever's Cal Bears program has produced more than 25 members of the U.S. Olympic team, including Haley Cope, Natalie Coughlin, Emily Silver, Jessica Hardy, Dana Vollmer, Caitlin Leverenz, Rachel Bootsma, Missy Franklin, Kathleen Baker, and Abbey Weitzeil. Other notable swimmers include Elizabeth Pelton and Isabel Ivey.  She previously served as an assistant coach for the United States Olympic women's swimming team at the 2004 Summer Olympics in Athens, Greece, and the 2008 Summer Olympics in Beijing, China.

In December 2010, she was selected as the head coach of the 2012 U.S. Olympic women's swim team that competed at the 2012 Summer Olympics in London.  She is the first woman to serve as the head coach of a U.S. women's national swim team at the Olympics.  She previously served as the head coach the U.S. women's national team for the 2010 Pan Pacific Swimming Championships.

In 2014, she was inducted into the American Swimming Coaches Association (ASCA) Hall of Fame.

Allegations of Professional Misconduct 

On May 24, 2022, it was reported that Coach McKeever was accused of the alleged bullying and emotional/verbal abuse of Cal swimmers dating back to 2014. According to media, "At least 26 people have alleged that Cal women's swimming head coach Teri McKeever has created a toxic culture rampant with severe verbal and emotional abuse that has led to significant mental and physical health ramifications for team members." The same day, the University of California, Berkeley released a statement confirming the allegations but their privacy policy prevented the University from commenting on the case.

Personal 

McKeever married Jerry Romani in 2007, after they met at a California Golden Bears football game.

See also 

 California Golden Bears
 List of University of Southern California people
 USC Trojans

References

External links 
 Teri McKeever – University of California coach profile at CalBears.com

1962 births
Living people
American Olympic coaches
American swimming coaches
California Golden Bears swimming coaches
USC Trojans women's swimmers
USC Rossier School of Education alumni
USC Trojans swimming coaches
Fresno State Bulldogs swimming coaches